Jeffrey Chidera Okudah (born February 2, 1999) is an American football cornerback for the Detroit Lions of the National Football League (NFL). He played college football at Ohio State, where he was a unanimous All-American in 2019 before being selected by the Lions third overall in the 2020 NFL Draft.

High school career
Okudah attended South Grand Prairie High School in Grand Prairie, Texas. A five-star recruit, he committed to Ohio State University in January 2017.

College career
As a true freshman at Ohio State in 2017, Okudah played in all 14 games and had 17 tackles. As a sophomore in 2018, he played in 13 games, recording 32 tackles. As a junior in 2019, he recorded his first career interception against the Miami Redhawks. As a junior in 2019, Okudah had 34 tackles, 9 passes defensed, and 3 interceptions. For his performance that season, he was unanimously named to the 2019 College Football All-America Team and was also named a finalist for the Jim Thorpe Award. Okudah decided to forgo his senior year by declaring for the 2020 NFL Draft.

Professional career

Okudah was considered to be the best cornerback prospect in the 2020 NFL Draft, where he was selected third overall by the Detroit Lions. He signed his four-year rookie contract with the team on July 13, 2020. The contract is worth a fully guaranteed $33.528 million, including a $21.944 million signing bonus. He suffered a hamstring injury during training camp and missed the opening season game. He returned in Week 2 against the Green Bay Packers, where he allowed six completions for 96 yards. The following week he recorded his first career interception off a pass thrown by Arizona Cardinals quarterback Kyler Murray. Okudah was placed on injured reserve after he underwent surgery to resolve a core muscle injury on December 15, 2020.

During the Lions' 2021 season opener against the San Francisco 49ers, Okudah ruptured his Achilles tendon and was placed on injured reserve.

NFL career statistics

References

External links

Detroit Lions bio
Ohio State Buckeyes bio

1999 births
Living people
People from Grand Prairie, Texas
Sportspeople from the Dallas–Fort Worth metroplex
American sportspeople of Nigerian descent
African-American players of American football
Players of American football from Texas
American football cornerbacks
Ohio State Buckeyes football players
All-American college football players
Detroit Lions players
21st-century African-American sportspeople